Stan Wawrinka was the defending champion, but withdrew before the tournament began.

Nick Kyrgios won the title, defeating David Goffin in the final, 4−6, 6−3, 7−5. This was his first ATP 500 level title.

Seeds

Draw

Finals

Top half

Bottom half

Qualifying

Seeds

Qualifiers

Lucky losers

Qualifying draw

First qualifier

Second qualifier

Third qualifier

Fourth qualifier

External links
Main draw
Qualifying draw

Rakuten Japan Open Tennis Championships Singles